Ivan Sapundjiev (born May 13, 1995) is a Macedonian professional basketball shooting guard who currently plays for TFT in the Macedonian First League.

References

External links
 
 www.basketball.realgm.com
 www.gol.mk

1995 births
Living people
Macedonian men's basketball players
Shooting guards
Sportspeople from Skopje